Robert Merski (born ) is a Democratic member of the Pennsylvania House of Representatives, representing the 2nd district.

Personal
Merski was born and grew up in Erie, Pennsylvania. He attended Cathedral Preparatory School and graduated from Mercyhurst University with a degree in education. He later received a master's degree from Wilkes University and worked as a social studies teacher for the Erie City School District. Merski's father, Robert Merski Sr., previously served as the Sheriff of Erie County.

Political career
Merski previously served on the Erie City Council for seven years. In 2018, he took a leave of absence from with the Erie City School District to run for the 2nd District seat after the incumbent, Florindo Fabrizio, announced he would not be running for reelection due to a terminal cancer diagnosis. Endorsed by Fabrizio before his passing, Merski won the Democratic primary over two other candidates by securing 47% of the vote and went on to beat Republican Tim Kuzma in the general election after receiving 65% of the vote.

Committee assignments 

 Game & Fisheries
 Gaming Oversight
 Insurance
 Urban Affairs

References

External links
Pennsylvania House of Representatives bio 

Democratic Party members of the Pennsylvania House of Representatives
Politicians from Erie, Pennsylvania
Mercyhurst University alumni
21st-century American politicians
1975 births
Living people
Wilkes University alumni